Clavus ebur is a species of sea snail, a marine gastropod mollusk in the family Drilliidae.

Description
The shell is pure white, strongly nodulosely plicate and obsoletely spirally striate. The length of the shell is 17 mm.

Distribution
This species is found in the demersal zone of tropical waters in the Western Atlantic Ocean.

References

 Tucker, J.K. 2004 Catalog of recent and fossil turrids (Mollusca: Gastropoda). Zootaxa 682:1–1295.

External links

ebur
Gastropods described in 1845